Tillandsia albertiana is a species of plant in the genus Tillandsia. It is endemic to the Salta Province of northern Argentina.

Cultivars
 Tillandsia 'Lisa's Jewell'
 Tillandsia 'Mystic Albert'
 Tillandsia 'Mystic Burgundy'
 Tillandsia 'Mystic Circle'
 Tillandsia 'Mystic Flame'
 Tillandsia 'Mystic Flame Orange'
 Tillandsia 'Mystic Rainbow'
 Tillandsia 'Mystic Rainbow Peach'
 Tillandsia 'Mystic Rainbow Pink'
 Tillandsia 'Mystic Trumpet'
 Tillandsia 'Mystic Trumpet Peach'
 Tillandsia 'Mystic Trumpet Pink'
 Tillandsia 'Mystic Twins'

References

albertiana
Endemic flora of Argentina
Plants described in 1969